Battery C or C battery or variation, may refer to:

Electrochemical batteries
 C battery (R14 battery)
 vacuum tube powering 'C' battery

Military units
 Battery "C", 1st Illinois Light Artillery Regiment
 Battery "C", 2nd Illinois Light Artillery Regiment
 Battery "C" Kentucky Light Artillery
 Battery "C" 1st Michigan Light Artillery Regiment
 Battery C, 1st Missouri Light Artillery Regiment
 Battery C, 2nd Missouri Light Artillery Regiment
 Battery C, 1st New Jersey Light Artillery
 Battery C, 1st New York Light Artillery
 Battery C, 1st Ohio Light Artillery
 Independent Battery C, Pennsylvania Light Artillery
 Battery C, 1st Pennsylvania Light Artillery
 Battery C, 1st Rhode Island Light Artillery Regiment
 Battery C, 3rd Rhode Island Heavy Artillery
 1st Battalion Tennessee Light Artillery, Battery "C"
 Battery C, 1st West Virginia Light Artillery Regiment
 4th U.S. Artillery, Battery C
 5th U.S. Artillery, Battery C

Other uses
 Battery C Site, Helena, Arkansas, USA; an American Civil War site

See also

 Battery (disambiguation)
 C (disambiguation)
 C cell (disambiguation)